Pervomaiske Raion is one of the 25 regions of the Autonomous Republic of Crimea, a territory recognized by a majority of countries as part of Ukraine and incorporated by Russia as the Republic of Crimea. It is situated in the north-western part of the republic. The raion is named after its administrative center, the urban-type settlement of Pervomaiske. Population:

References

Raions of Crimea